Ataullah ( or ) or the alternative Atallah is an Arabic given name meaning "gift of God", composed of Ata (gift) + Allah (God). It is also a surname to Middle Eastern Christians, derived from the Aramaic form Attallah or Atallah. The Iranian variant of the same name is Ataollah.

Persons

Given name
 Sultan Ataullah Muhammad Shah I (1422–1472), Sultan of Kedah
 Sultan Ataullah Muhammad Shah II (1687–1698), Sultan of Kedah
 Ataullah Rashidi, 17th century architect from Mughal Empire of present-day India
 Attallah Suheimat (1875–1965), Jordanian politician
 Syed Ata Ullah Shah Bukhari (1892–1961), Indian religious and political leader
 Qazi Ataullah Khan (1895–1952), Pakistani politician
 Ataollah Khosravani (1919–?), Iranian politician
 Ataullah Mengal (1929–2021), Chief Minister of Balochistan, Pakistan
 Ataullah Bogdan Kopański (born 1948), Polish-born historian
 Ataollah Salehi (born 1950), commander-in-chief of the Iranian Army
 Attaullah Khan Esakhelvi (born 1951), Pakistani folk singer
 Ata'ollah Mohajerani (born 1964), Iranian historian, politician, journalist, and author
 Ataullah Guerra (born 1987), Trinidadian footballer
 Ataullah (cricketer), (born 1986) Pakistani cricketer
 Attaullah (Afghan cricketer) (born 1990), Afghan cricketer
 Ataullah abu Ammar Jununi, leader of the Arakan Rohingya Salvation Army
 Ataollah Zahed (1915–1991), Iranian actor, film director, film produce, screenplay writer, educator, and a voice-over actor.
 Ataollah Ashrafi Esfahani (1902–1982), Iranian Shia cleric

Middle name
 Salah al-Din Attallah Suheimat, or just Salah Suheimat (1914–1966), Jordanian politician
 Muhammad Atta-ullah Faizani (1923–?), Afghan Muslim scholar

Family name
 Naim Attallah (1931–2021), Palestinian businessman and writer
 Samir Atallah (born 1941), Lebanese journalist, author and political analyst
 Elias Atallah (born 1947), Lebanese politician
 Alain Attalah (born 1964), Egyptian basketball player
 Christine Atallah (1965–2011), Canadian singer-songwriter
 Nasri Atallah (born 1982), Lebanese-British author
 Bassel Atallah, Firas Atallah and Rami Atallah, Syrian Canadian businessmen, co-founders of SSENSE 
 Mikhail Atallah, Lebanese-American computer scientist

See also
 Atala (disambiguation)
 Theodore (given name)

Arabic masculine given names
Iranian masculine given names